The Registered Cossacks of the Russian Federation are a Cossack paramilitary formation that also performs non-military state services, on the basis of the Federal Law of the Russian Federation dated December 5, 2005 No. 154-FZ "On State Service of the Russian Cossacks".

In peacetime, the Registered Cossacks tend to be involved in conservation, protection and restoration of forests, education of children and young people in patriotic values and preparation for military service, aiding during natural disasters, accidents, and other emergencies and fire-fighting. Municipal level Cossack police (including Special Forces) operate numerous guard formations.

Registered Cossacks receive a stipend and are granted certain privileges: a uniform, a rank, insignia and awards, wearing a Cossack whip, sword, Khanjali/Qama dagger and, in certain cases, firearms or a firearms permit in exchange for providing security in certain areas. Cossacks often wear Uniforms of the Russian Armed Forces or uniforms similar to that of the Imperial Russian Army.

Cossack ranks from yesaul and above are appointed by a Presidential Envoy, the rank of a Cossack general by no less than the President of the Russian Federation. All other ranks are promoted by their respective troop commandants.

Russo-Ukrainian War

Various Registered Cossacks of the Russian Federation were identified operating in Eastern Ukraine and Crimea in 2014 during the Russo-Ukrainian War.

The list of Registered Cossacks of the Russian Federation

Cossack hosts
The Russian Federation has eleven Cossack hosts officially recognized by the federal government.

Independent Districts
In addition to the military Cossack societies, there are other registered societies which are active auxiliaries:

 Separate Northwest Cossack District (Territory of activity - Northwestern Federal District). Headquarters - St. Petersburg;
 District Cossack society "Baltic separate Cossack District - Baltic Cossack Union" (Territory of activity - the Kaliningrad region). Headquarters - Kaliningrad;
 District Cossack society "Sevastopol Cossack District '(Territory of activity - Sevastopol). Headquarters - Sevastopol.
 Crimean Cossack District Society "Crimean Cossack troops" (Territory of activity, Republic of Crimea),. Headquarters - Simferopol.

Cossack ranks and insignia
Officers
The rank insignia of commissioned officers.

Other ranks
The rank insignia of non-commissioned officers and enlisted personnel.

Historic ranks
Officers

Other ranks

See also
 History of the Cossacks
 Cossack explorers

References

Combat occupations
Military of Russia
Government paramilitary forces
History of the Cossacks in Russia